Jaromír Kohlíček (23 February 1953 – 6 December 2020) was a Czech politician.

Career
He was born in Teplice. After studies at University of Chemical Technologies he ran unsuccessfully as a candidate for the Senate. He was also member of Lower Chamber of Czech Republic Parliament (from 1998 to 2004, when he was elected to European Parliament).

Member of the European Parliament for the Communist Party of Bohemia and Moravia, a part of the European United Left–Nordic Green Left party group in the European Parliament.

References 

1953 births
2020 deaths
MEPs for the Czech Republic 2004–2009
MEPs for the Czech Republic 2009–2014
Communist Party of Bohemia and Moravia MEPs
MEPs for the Czech Republic 2014–2019
People from Teplice
Members of the Chamber of Deputies of the Czech Republic (1998–2002)
Members of the Chamber of Deputies of the Czech Republic (2002–2006)
Communist Party of Czechoslovakia politicians
University of Chemistry and Technology, Prague alumni